Amoreh (also Romanized as Āmoreh and Āmoreh) is a village in Dastjerd Rural District, Khalajastan District, Qom County, Qom Province, Iran. At the 2006 census, its population was 107, in 54 families.

The language of Āmoreh is one of endangered Iranian languages. It is located on the border of Central plateau and Northwestern group of Iranian languages.

References 

Populated places in Qom Province